Andrei Nikolaevich Chistyakov or Andrey Chistiakov (Андрей Николаевич Чистяков) (4 January 1949, in Leningrad – 29 November 2000, in Moscow) was a Russian conductor and National Artist of Russia.

He studied conducting at the Leningrad Conservatory under Ilya Musin. From 1978-1988 he was chief conductor of the Symphony Orchestra of the Sverdlovsk Philharmonic, from 1988 conductor of the Bolshoi Theatre.

Selected discography
 Sergei Prokofiev: Piano Concerto No. 3. Evgeny Kissin, piano; Andrei Chistyakov conducting the Moscow Philharmonic Orchestra. Live performances: 1984-86.
 Sergei Rachmaninov, Aleko.
 Pyotr Ilyich Tchaikovsky, stage music from The Snow Maiden
 Rimsky-Korsakov, May Night 1994
 Alexander Dargomyzhsky, The Stone Guest 1995
 Dmitri Shostakovich fragment The Gambler Act1. 1995
 Alexander Serov Judith Irina Udalova (Judith), Russian Academic Choir of the USSR, Male Chamber Choir & Bolshoi Theatre Orchestra, 1990, reissued Brilliant 2011

References

1949 births
2000 deaths
People's Artists of Russia
20th-century Russian conductors (music)
Russian male conductors (music)
20th-century Russian male musicians
Burials in Troyekurovskoye Cemetery